Emory T. Clark (September 17, 1905 – February 27, 1984) was an American businessman.

Biography
Emory Clark was born on September 17, 1905 in Waycross, Georgia. In the 1920s, he moved to Gary, Indiana and later Chicago, Illinois with his widowed mother and four brothers to work in construction. During the Great Depression in the United States, however, he was unable to find work.

In 1932, he moved to Milwaukee and opened a filling station in West Allis, Wisconsin, paving the way for the creation of the Clark Oil and Refining Corporation, now known as Clark Brands. He retired in 1974, but resumed management in 1978. By 1979, Clark Oil and Refining Corporation comprised 1,814 stations in ten midwestern states with total sales of over $1 billion. That year, he recruited a successor. He sold his shares in 1981.

In 1983, he appeared on the Forbes 400 list. He founded the Emory T. Clark Family Charitable Foundation in 1982. He lived in Elm Grove, Wisconsin. He had three sons and two daughters.

He died of cancer on February 27, 1984. The Emory T. Clark Hall in the College of Nursing at Marquette University is named for him.

See also

References

1905 births
1984 deaths
People from Waycross, Georgia
Businesspeople from Milwaukee
20th-century American businesspeople
People from Elm Grove, Wisconsin